The Klehm House is a historic house in Kearney, Nebraska. It was built in 1931 for Walter Klehm, a professor of Manual Arts at the University of Nebraska at Kearney. It was designed in the Tudor Revival architectural style by Klehm himself. It has been listed on the National Register of Historic Places since March 25, 1999.

References

National Register of Historic Places in Buffalo County, Nebraska
Tudor Revival architecture in the United States
Houses completed in 1931